Khoe Soe Lu Hnite 2: Taw Kyi Kan is a 2017 Burmese action-drama film, directed by Steel (Dwe Myittar) starring Myint Myat, Khin Hlaing, Htoo Char and Moe Hay Ko. It is the second movie of Khoe Soe Lu Hnite film series. The film, produced by Moe Film Production premiered in Myanmar on December 22, 2017.

Cast
Myint Myat as Taw Kyi Kan
Khin Hlaing as Tauk Tae
Htoo Char as Yin Shan
Moe Hay Ko as Dee Dee Poe

References

2017 films
2010s Burmese-language films
Burmese action films
Films shot in Myanmar
2017 action films